Malicious Intent (2004) is a crime novel by Australian author Kathryn Fox. It won the Davitt Award for Best Adult Novel and was shortlisted for Ned Kelly Awards – Best First Novel in 2005.

Plot summary
Pathologist and forensic physician, Dr Anya Crichton, discovers a link between the death of a teenage girl from a drug overdose and a number of apparent suicides.

Notes
 Dedication: To Mum and Dad for giving me the heart, soul and wings to fly. With eternal thanks, respect and love.

Reviews
Philippa Stockley in The Washington Post called the novel "Oddball but brilliant".
Sophie Groom in Australia reviewed it as well

Awards and nominations
 2005 shortlisted Ned Kelly Awards – Best First Novel 
 2005 winner Davitt Award – Best Adult Novel

References

2004 Australian novels
Australian crime novels